Ghazalla Sial or Ghazala Siyal is a Pakistani politician who is a member of the Provincial Assembly of Sindh since June 2013.

Early life and education
She was born on 29 January 1966 in Khairpur District. She earned an LL.B. and the Master of Arts from Shah Abdul Latif University. and also done Master of Laws.

Political career
She was elected to the Provincial Assembly of Sindh as a candidate of Pakistan Peoples Party (PPP) on a reserved seat for women in 2013 Pakistani general election.

She was then re-elected to the Provincial Assembly of Sindh as a candidate of the Pakistan Peoples Party Parliamentarians to a similar seat in Pakistani general election, 2018.

References

Living people
Women members of the Provincial Assembly of Sindh
Pakistan People's Party MPAs (Sindh)
Sindhi people
People from Khairpur District
Sindh MPAs 2013–2018
1966 births
21st-century Pakistani women politicians